Longidorus sylphus (Thorne's needle nematode) is a plant pathogenic nematode, which attacks mint.

References

External links 
 Longidorus elongatus at Nemaplex, University of California

Enoplea
Agricultural pest nematodes
Nematodes described in 1939